Sebastian Wolf (born 19 January 1985) is a German former professional footballer who played as a centre-back or left-back.

External links
 
 

1985 births
Living people
German footballers
Association football central defenders
Association football fullbacks
SpVgg Greuther Fürth players
SV Wacker Burghausen players
VfB Stuttgart II players
SV Wehen Wiesbaden players
SV Elversberg players
FC 08 Homburg players
3. Liga players
Regionalliga players